Kwinten Clappaert (born 6 December 1988 in Lochristi) is a Belgian footballer who last played for SC Wielsbeke.

Career 
Clappaert made his debut for KSC Lokeren in February 2006 as a replacement in a 1–2 Belgian First Division game defeat against K. Sint-Truidense V.V. He played for HSV Hoek in the Dutch third division in the 2010/11 season.

Personal life 
He is currently studying industrial engineering at KaHo Sint-Lieven in Ghent.

See also
Football in Belgium
List of football clubs in Belgium

References

External links
 
 

1988 births
Living people
Belgian footballers
Belgian Pro League players
K.S.C. Lokeren Oost-Vlaanderen players
HSV Hoek players
People from Lochristi
Association football midfielders
Footballers from East Flanders